The Canet River is a tributary of Matagami Lake, flowing into the territory of Eeyou Istchee Baie-James (municipality), in the administrative region of Nord-du-Québec, in Quebec, in Canada.

The Canet River flows in forest and marsh zone (especially in its upper part), East of Lake Matagami. This course has a very slight difference in level. Road transport to James Bay is the main economic activity of this watershed. The surface of the river is usually frozen from the beginning of December to the end of April.

Coming from Matagami, the James Bay road passes first between Olga Lake and the Canet River; then this road forks north to cut the Canet River in the middle. Then it goes straight back to the north, passing west of Poncheville Lake.

Geography 

This source of the river is located:
 north of the watershed with the hydrographic slope of Olga Lake which is crossed by the Waswanipi River;
 south of the watershed with the Poncheville Lake watershed that flows northward to the Broadback River.

The main hydrographic slopes near the Canet River are:
 North side: Poncheville Lake, Ouescapis Lake, Chensagi River;
 East side: Goéland Lake, Waswanipi River;
 South side: Olga Lake, Waswanipi River;
 West side: Matagami Lake, Nottaway River.

From its source, the Canet River flows over  generally to the southwest, according to the following segments:
 south, then east, to a creek (coming from the east);
 to the south, to a creek (coming from the southwest);
 easterly to a creek (coming from the northeast);
 southeasterly, snaking to a creek (coming from the east);
 southwesterly to the point where the river widens;
 westerly, with widening of the river), to the confluence of the river 

The Canet River discharges at the bottom of a bay on the east shore of Matagami Lake which is connected to the Bay of the confluence of the Waswanipi River whose course crosses Lake Olga and is located south of the Canet River. The Matagami Lake empties on the North-West side by the North Bay in the Nottaway River. The latter will flow on the south-eastern shore of James Bay.

Toponymy 
The toponym "Canet River" was formalized on December 5, 1968, at the Commission de toponymie du Quebec, i.e. at the creation of this commission

References

See also 
James Bay
Rupert Bay
Broadback River, a watercourse
Evans Lake, a body of water
List of rivers of Quebec

Rivers of Nord-du-Québec
Broadback River drainage basin
Eeyou Istchee James Bay